Trenni Casey ( Kusnierek; born April 30, 1977) is a sports anchor and reporter for NBC Sports Boston.

Early life 
Casey is a graduate of Muskego High School and a 1999 journalism graduate of Marquette University."Marquette alumnae open up about their careers as women in sports journalism", Marquette University.

She appeared as herself on the TV show Change of Heart around 1999.

Career 
Casey has previously worked at WDJT-TV (2001-2002), FSN Pittsburgh (2003-2007), ABC Sports (2005), and FSN Wisconsin (2008), and as a reporter and former studio host for the MLB Network as well as some work for the Big Ten Network and the NFL Network. For one season, she worked with Kevin Harlan and Rich Gannon as a sideline reporter for Green Bay Packers preseason. 

From 2011 to 2013, Casey worked for WTMJ (AM) and ESPN 540 in Milwaukee as a sports reporter and talk show host. 

Casey was hired by NBC Sports to work as a curling reporter during the 2014 and 2018 Winter Olympics, and also covered tennis for NBC Sports at the 2016 and 2020 Summer Olympics. 

Casey has also worked at WEEI-FM in Boston as a weekend and substitute program host.
Casey falsely accused a group of West Points cadets of flashing a "white power" symbol during the Army-Navy game, and demanded their immediate expulsion. Casey refused to apologize after a subsequent investigation quickly exonerated the cadets, who were in fact playing the well known "circle game"

References

External links
 
 

1977 births
College basketball announcers in the United States
College football announcers
Curling broadcasters
Green Bay Packers announcers
Major League Baseball broadcasters
Marquette University alumni
Milwaukee Brewers announcers
MLB Network personalities
National Football League announcers
Pittsburgh Pirates announcers
People from Waukesha County, Wisconsin
Living people